Chisel Peak is a prominent chisel-shaped peak rising to about  on the southeast side of Perplex Ridge, Pourquoi Pas Island, in Marguerite Bay. It was named descriptively by the UK Antarctic Place-Names Committee in 1979.

References
 

Mountains of Graham Land
Fallières Coast